Jonathan Gustavo Zárate (born 6 February 1999) is an Argentine professional footballer who plays as a midfielder for Aldosivi.

Career
Zárate came through the Aldosivi academy. 2020 saw the midfielder move into the Primera División club's first-team, initially as an unused substitute for a Copa Argentina round of sixty-four defeat to Primera B Metropolitana's Talleres on 26 February. His senior debut arrived later that year on 14 November, with Guillermo Hoyos selecting him to come off the bench with twenty-six minutes remaining of a 4–1 home loss to San Lorenzo in the Copa de la Liga Profesional.

Career statistics
.

Notes

References

External links

1999 births
Living people
Sportspeople from Mar del Plata
Argentine footballers
Association football midfielders
Aldosivi footballers